George Morgan may refer to:

Arts and entertainment
George T. Morgan (1845–1925), British born engraver, designer of the Morgan Dollar
George Morgan (screenwriter) (1854–1936), American screenwriter
George E. Morgan (1870–1969), American artist
George Frederick Morgan (1922–2004), American poet
George Morgan (singer) (1924–1975), American country music singer

Military
George W. Morgan (1820–1893), American Civil War Union general
George N. Morgan (1825–1866), Canadian-born American Civil War general, father of George H. Morgan
George H. Morgan (1855–1948), American cavalry officer and Medal of Honor recipient

Politics and law
George Morgan (New York) (1816–1879), American politician, New York state senator
George Osborne Morgan (1826–1897), Welsh lawyer and politician
George Hay Morgan (1866–1931), British Member of Parliament for Truro

Sports
George Morgan (cricketer) (1844–1896), Australian cricketer
George Morgan (footballer) (1877–1948), Australian rules footballer
George J. Morgan (1912–1979), Irish rugby union player
George Morgan (tennis) (born 1993), British tennis player

Others
George Morgan (merchant) (1743–1810), American merchant and representative to Native Americans
George Cadogan Morgan (1754–1798), Welsh dissenting minister and scientist
G. Campbell Morgan (1863–1945), British evangelist, preacher and Bible scholar